Salvia grandifolia is a perennial plant that is native to Yunnan and Sichuan provinces in China, found growing in gorges at  elevation.

Notes

grandifolia
Flora of China